Carlos Franz Thorud (born March 3, 1959) is a writer from Chile, who also holds Spanish citizenship.

Biography
The son of the Chilean diplomat of German descent Carlos Franz Núñez and the stage actress of Norwegian descent Miriam Thorud Oliva, Carlos Franz was born in  Geneva, Switzerland, where his father was posted. At age 11, after having also lived in Argentina, he arrived to Chile.

Franz studied law at the Universidad de Chile (1976-1981) and became a member of the Chilean Bar in 1983, a career that he abandoned four years later so as to dedicate himself to literature. Between 1981 and 1983 he attended the literary workshop of José Donoso.

Franz has written the novels Santiago Cero (1988); El lugar donde estuvo el Paraíso (1996); El desierto (2005); Almuerzo de vampiros (2007); and Si te vieras con mis ojos (2015).

Some of his works have been translated into other languages (English, German, French, Italian, Dutch, Portuguese, Finnish, Polish, Romanian, and Chinese), and El lugar donde estuvo el Paraíso was made into a movie by the Spaniard Gerardo Herrero with the Argentine actor Federico Luppi in the leading role.

In addition to novels, Franz has written short stories (his collection La prisionera 2005).

Franz's work has been praised critically by prestigious authors. Mario Vargas Llosa wrote "in El desierto, Carlos Franz tells a fascinating story that is, at the same time, a dive into the depths of cruelty and human compassion, and into the violence of history.  Written and constructed with a master's hand, this is one of the most original novels produced in modern Latin American literature.

Carlos Fuentes referred to Franz as "a new voice, powerful, creative and committed to the word" and regarding Almuerzo de vampiros he wrote that it "gives birth to absolutely unique, independent, and creative forms of narration".<ref>Carlos Fuentes. Los vampiros de Franz, El País, 16.08.2008; accessed 28.05.2013</ref>

Honors and awards
Premio Latinoamericano de Novela CICLA 1988 forSantiago CeroFinalist Premio Planeta Argentina 1996 for El lugar donde estuvo el paraísoFinalist Premio Altazor 2002 forLa muralla enterradaPremio Municipal de Santiago 2002 for La muralla enterradaPremio del Consejo Nacional del Libro de Chile 2005, for La prisioneraFinalist Premio Altazor 2006 for El desiertoPremio Internacional de Novela La Nación-Sudamericana for El desiertoArtist in Residence in Berlín  DAAD 2000-2001
Visiting Fellow, University of Cambridge, 2001
Cátedra Julio Cortázar, Universidad de Guadalajara, 2010
Resident Fellow, Bellagio Center, Rockefeller Foundation, 2012

Works
 Santiago cero, novel, 1988
 El lugar donde estuvo el Paraíso, novel, 1996
 La muralla enterrada. Santiago, ciudad imaginaria, essay, 2001
 El desierto, novel, 2005
 Almuerzo de vampiros, Madrid, 2007
 La prisionera, stories, Santiago, 2008
 Alejandra Magna, illustrated and bi-lingual English Spanish edition (translation by Jonathan Blitzer), Ediciones del Centro, Madrid, 2011
 The Absent Sea, Translated from El desierto'' by Leland H. Chambers, 2011,

Notes

References

  The Absent Sea

Links
Franz in the Biblioteca Virtual Cervantes
Cuento de Franz La prisionera, reproduced in the magazinea Lecturas Nº3
Carlos Franz in Letras Libres
Artículos de Carlos Franz in El País
Dr. Alfonso de Toro on El desierto
Review of the story  La prisionera
Franze in Lecturalia

Chilean male writers
Chilean people of Norwegian descent
1959 births
Living people